4th Congress may refer to:
4th Congress of the Communist Party of Yugoslavia (1928)
4th Congress of the Philippines (1958–1961)
4th Congress of the Russian Social Democratic Labour Party (1906)
4th Congress of the Workers' Party of Korea (1961)
4th National Congress of the Chinese Communist Party (1925)
4th National Congress of the Communist Party of the Philippines (1946)
4th National Congress of the Kuomintang (1931)
4th National Congress of the Lao People's Revolutionary Party (1986)
4th National People's Congress (1975–1978)
4th United States Congress (1795–1797)
4th World Congress of the Communist International (1922)
Basel Congress (1869), the 4th Congress of the First International
International Socialist Workers and Trade Union Congress, London 1896, the 4th Congress of the Second International